This article is about the fauna of Metropolitan France, including Corsica. For the animal life in the French Overseas territories, see : Fauna of French Guiana, Fauna of French Polynesia, Fauna of Martinique, Fauna of Réunion, Fauna of Guadeloupe, Fauna of Mayotte and Fauna of Saint Pierre and Miquelon.

Animals include:

 Birds : see List of birds of Metropolitan France
 Mammals : see List of mammals of Metropolitan France
 Fishes : see List of fish of Metropolitan France
 Reptiles : see List of reptiles of Metropolitan France
 Amphibians : see List of amphibians of Metropolitan France
 Insects : : see List of insects of Metropolitan France
 Mollusks : see List of non-marine molluscs of Metropolitan France

See also 
 Outline of France
 Wildlife of Metropolitan France